The Brătcuța is a left tributary of the river Crișul Repede in Romania. It discharges into the Crișul Repede near Bratca.

References

Rivers of Romania
Rivers of Bihor County